Ahmed Fathy Abdelmonem Ahmed Ibrahim (born 10 November 1984) is an Egyptian professional footballer who plays for Pyramids.

Born in Banha, he usually plays in the right back role for club and country. He started his career with Egyptian side Ismaily SC before moving to England to play in the Premier League with Sheffield United in 2007. Fathy returned to Egypt after only a few months however, signing to Al Ahly where he has remained until April 2020 where he signed to Pyramids FC, whilst also spending some time on loan at both Kuwait side Kazma and Hull City back in England. Alongside his club career, Fathy has represented Egypt since 2002, playing over one hundred games and scoring nine goals for his country.

Club career

Early career: Ismaily and Sheffield United
Fathy played as a midfielder and right back for Ismaily in Egypt, where he won the 2001–02 Egyptian Premier League. In early 2007, Egyptian newspaper Al-Ahram reported that Fathy's club had accepted Sheffield United's £700,000 offer for the player, and after a number of weeks of protracted negotiations, Fathy signed a three and a half year contract on 24 January 2007. Fathy made his Premier League debut for United as a substitute in the closing minutes of a 2–1 victory over Tottenham Hotspur at Bramall Lane on 10 February 2007, and made his full first team debut at Anfield against Liverpool on 24 February 2007, but failed to hold down a regular spot for the Blades.

Al Ahly
Fathy had been linked with a move to the Egyptian club El Zamalek for 2 million Euro after discussions with Sheffield United's management, but the player refused the transfer even though the clubs had agreed a fee – with Fathy insisting he wanted to continue his career as a professional player outside of Egypt. However, El Zamalek's Egyptian rivals Al Ahly succeeded in gaining Fathy's consent for a move and Sheffield United's agreement to a deal. On 10 September 2007 Fathy joined El-Ahly for a fee of £675,000 after making just three senior appearances for United in the eight months he had spent with the club.

Fathy had been signed after the transfer window in Egypt had closed however, and with Al-Ahly being unable to register him to play until the following January, they looked to place Fathy on loan outside of the country to help to regain match fitness. Al Ahly managed to broker a deal with Kuwaiti side Kazma to accept the player on a loan, where Fathy played regularly for the first team, scoring four goals. Fathy finally made his Al Ahly debut in an away game against Arab Contractors on 10 March 2008, and went on to become Ahly's first choice in central midfield alongside Hossam Ashour. Following the departure of Ahmed Sedik in 2009, Fathy was moved to right back where he once again became a regular for the team.

Loan to Hull City
In January 2013, English Championship side Hull City expressed an interest in signing Fathy, along with his teammate Gedo, on loan until the end of the 2012–13 season. On 31 January 2013, Hull City had finalized a six-month loan deal for Fathy and Gedo, with Hull paying £500,000 for each player's services. Fathy made his debut on 16 February 2013 at home in a 1–0 win against Charlton Athletic, appearing as a second-half substitute for Paul McShane.

Umm Salal
He left Al Ahly after his contract expired in June 2014 and joined Umm Salal in Qatar in August 2014 after an unsuccessful trial with English giants Arsenal.

Return to Al Ahly
Fathy rejoined Al Ahly in 2015. In April 2020, he decided to leave the club by the end of the season.

Pyramids FC
On 11 April 2020, Pyramids FC announced that Fathy would be joining their side at the end of the season on a free transfer after Al Ahly's failure of securing a contract renewal with the 35 year old defender.  This transfer resulted in mixed feelings toward Fathy from Al Ahly fans, who have previously lost another star of the team, Abdallah El Said, to Pyramids.

International career

Fathy became Egypt's youngest ever international when he was capped at 17 years old in 2001 against South Africa. Fathi was picked for the National team by Egyptian Coach Mohsen Saleh even before playing in his club's first team Ismaily SC, although this followed soon after, and was then called up for the Egyptian youth team. Fathy was a member of the Egyptian youth team that won the African Youth Cup 2003 in Burkina Faso, and was part of the Egypt squad at the FIFA U-20 World Cup in the United Arab Emirates in 2003, and at one point Fathi was part of Egypt's U-20, U-23 and senior squads at the same time. Fathy was also part of the Egypt squad that won the Africa Cup of Nations at the Cairo International Stadium in 2006, when they beat Ivory Coast on penalties in the final.

In the 2010 Africa Cup of Nations, Fathy was named as the fair player of the tournament and he was named in the team of the tournament.

In May 2018, he was named in Egypt's squad for the 2018 World Cup in Russia. He scored an own goal in the match against Russia.

Career statistics

International

International goals
Scores and results list Egypt's goal tally first.

Honours

Club
Ismaily
Egyptian Premier League: 2001–02

Al Ahly
Egyptian Premier League: 2007–08, 2008–09, 2009–10, 2010–11, 2013–14, 2015–16, 2016–17, 2017–18, 2018–19, 2019–20
Egypt Cup: 2016–17, 2019–20
Egyptian Super Cup: 2010, 2011–12, 2015, 2017، 2018
CAF Champions League: 2008, 2012, 2013,  2019–20
CAF Confederation Cup: 2014
African Super Cup: 2009, 2014

International

Egypt
 Africa Cup of Nations: 2006, 2008, 2010
 Nile Basin Tournament: 2011
 Pan Arab Games: 2007
 African Youth Championship: 2003

Individual 
 IFFHS CAF Men's Team of the Decade 2011–2020
 CAF Team of the Year: 2012

See also

List of men's footballers with 100 or more international caps

References

External links

1984 births
Living people
People from Benha
Egyptian footballers
Egypt international footballers
2004 African Cup of Nations players
2006 Africa Cup of Nations players
2008 Africa Cup of Nations players
2009 FIFA Confederations Cup players
2010 Africa Cup of Nations players
2017 Africa Cup of Nations players
Association football midfielders
Ismaily SC players
Sheffield United F.C. players
Al Ahly SC players
Kazma SC players
Hull City A.F.C. players
Umm Salal SC players
Egyptian Premier League players
Premier League players
English Football League players
Qatar Stars League players
Egyptian expatriate footballers
Egyptian expatriate sportspeople in England
Egyptian expatriate sportspeople in Kuwait
Egyptian expatriate sportspeople in Qatar
Expatriate footballers in England
Expatriate footballers in Kuwait
Expatriate footballers in Qatar
Olympic footballers of Egypt
Footballers at the 2012 Summer Olympics
FIFA Century Club
Africa Cup of Nations-winning players
2018 FIFA World Cup players
Kuwait Premier League players